Citizen Queen is an American girl group consisting of vocalists Kaedi Dalley, Cora Isabel, Nina Nelson, and Kaylah Sharve’. The group was formed in 2018 under the auspices of RCA Records, with mentorship from Pentatonix member Scott Hoying.

Formation
Pentatonix member Scott Hoying, along with arrangers and producers Ben Bram and Shams Ahmed, "hand-selected" the original five members of the group. The members of the band "come from different states and different ethnic backgrounds".

Singer and beatboxer Cora Isabel was the first member chosen, after sending audition videos to the arrangers. Bram first saw Hannah Mrozak on season 13 of The Voice "where she made it to the playoffs in 2017 as a member of Adam Levine's and Jennifer Hudson's teams". Bram "reached out to Mrozak" and "encouraged her to audition" for Citizen Queen. The members of the group were "complete strangers before the group's founding", except for SoCal VoCals members Nelson and Sharve’. Bram had been music director of the SoCal VoCals before participating in the formation of Pentatonix and Citizen Queen. Sharve’ had also previously released an album and performed in her home state of Texas.

The group has been identified as playing a part in the revival of girl groups in the United States. Refinery29 stated that the group "kicks down the doors with their powerful official debut, and the perfectly placed harmonies, bass, and vocal percussion on the original song all but promise a top spot for the talented newbies. Forget what you heard — girl groups ain't dead, y'all". Nylon described the group as "Modern representation plus Danity Kane-levels of pop ear-worminess? This is the girl group we deserve!" The group has been described as "unique because they tend to rely more on their voices rather than singing along to a beat". Cosmopolitan compared the group to Fifth Harmony, and their origin to the movie, Pitch Perfect, noting that "after going through a cappella boot camps and auditions, the girls joined forces to create pop anthems and covers". Fringe noted that the group had "received praise from the likes of everyone from Ariana Grande to Meghan Trainor".

Song production and touring
The group reportedly first worked out of an Airbnb in Los Angeles, recording "four fully produced songs and music videos" in the course of a week. Their first popular video was "Evolution of Girl Groups", a six-minute medley of 25 songs, which was posted to YouTube in January 2019. It had received nearly 10 million views by June 2019, and over 18 million views by August 2020, passing 20 million views in December 2020.

In July 2019, the group opened for Pentatonix on a nine-week world tour, with the tour also featuring Rachel Platten. The group went on to record well-viewed videos for "No Tears Left to Cry" by Ariana Grande, "Lost in Japan" by Shawn Mendes, and "Never Enough" from The Greatest Showman. In June 2020, the group performed an arrangement of "Free Your Mind" by En Vogue for the 2020 Pride Benefit Concert put on by RCA Records and the Human Rights Campaign. In December 2020, the group released their first original song, "Call Me Queen", written by Justin Tranter, Nova Wav, and Shawn Wasabi, and accompanied by a music video produced by Lauren Dunn. The group also performed that month at TheWrap's 2020 Power Women Summit. In January 2021, the group released an official remix of "Call Me Queen" by Armada Music artist Frank Pole.

The group's next original song was "No Ego", written by Justin Tranter and songwriting duo Nova Wav and released in March 2021. In April 2021, the group released the original ballad, "Y", reported by the group to have been inspired by a bad breakup experienced by Mrozak. Shortly after the posting of a video on TikTok introducing the song, it was reported that the video had received "almost four million views and over nine thousand comments".

In June 2022, the group released their original single, “XO”, written by Nova Wav, Kiana Ledé, Amiyah “AJ” Brown, Nina Nelson, Kaedi Dalley, Kaylah Sharve’, and Cora Isabel, and accompanied by a music video directed by Jadagrace. Two weeks later, they released another original, "Waste My Time", reviewed by Billboard as "effortlessly harmonizing and recalling the past eras of girl groups, with Dalley’s impossibly rich tone on full display". In December 2022, Fifth Harmony member Dinah Jane released a collaboration with the group, that being a "holiday medley of Justin Bieber's "Mistletoe", Ariana Grande's "Santa Tell Me, and Fifth Harmony's "Can You See" from holiday film The Star".

Nelson and Dalley were also writers on the Twice song "Moonlight Sunrise", released in January 2023.

Members
 Cora Isabel (Beatboxer/Alto) (born February 24, 2001)
 Kaedi Dalley (Bass) (born December 2, 2000)
 Kaylah Sharve’ (Mezzo-soprano) (born January 6, 1999)
 Nina Ann Nelson (Soprano) (born March 25, 1998)

Hannah Mrozak, an original member of the group, announced her departure on social media in May 2022. The group then announced that it would continue as a quartet, and thereafter released new material as a quartet.

Chart performance
In December 2020, Citizen Queen had three songs on the South African iTunes Pop 100, these being their covers of "No Tears Left to Cry" at #48, "Slow Burn" at #96, and "Lost in Japan" at #100.

In May 2021, the original song "Y" reached #48 on the Nigerian iTunes Pop 100.

Discography

CD's

Singles 

 2020: Call Me Queen
 2021: No Ego
 2021: Y
 2022: XO
 2022: Waste My Time
 2022: Break Up
 2023: So Special

Covers 

 2018: No Tears Left to Cry (Ariana Grande)
 2018: This Christmas (Donny Hathaway)
 2018: Lost in Japan (Shawn Mendes)
 2019: Evolution Of Girl Groups
 2019: Never Enough (The Greatest Showman OST)
 2019: Best Part (Daniel Caesar feat. H.E.R.)
 2019: Good as Hell (Lizzo)
 2019: Señorita (Shawn Mendes & Camila Cabello)
 2019: Bad Guy (Billie Eilish)
 2020: Whack World Medley (Tierra Whack)
 2020: Slow Burn (Kacey Musgraves)
 2020: Free Your Mind (En Vogue)
 2020: Everybody Business (Kehlani)
 2022: Killing Me Softly with His Song (Roberta Flack)
 2022: Don't Call Me Angel (Ariana Grande, Lana Del Rey & Miley Cyrus)

Music videos

Tours

Opening Act 

 Pentatonix: The World Tour (2019-2022)

References

External links
RCA Records artist page for Citizen Queen
"Meet Citizen Queen; Think Pentatonix…but ALL GIRLS!!!" KROI (92.1 FM) (December 7, 2018)
Mark Franklin, "Former Voice standout Hannah Mrozak now part of Citizen Queen", Idol Chatter (December 8, 2018)

American pop girl groups
Professional a cappella groups
Musical groups established in 2018